Kees, de zoon van de Stroper  is a 1951 Dutch film directed by Ernst Winar.

Cast
Sjoerd van Driel	... 	Kees Schippers
Jaap Kallenborn		
Ankie de Meyer	... 	Joke van Dalen
Dick Visser	... 	Arie
Paul Kallenborn	... 	Jaap van Dalen
Aleid van Rhein	... 	Father van Dalen
Lex de Koning	... 	Piet
Wim Rhemrev	... 	Henk
Hylke van der Zee	... 	Jan
Bart van Mourik	... 	Wim
Frans Merkelij	... 	Wim

External links 
 

1951 films
Dutch black-and-white films
1950s Dutch-language films